Kenny Livèze (born 10 April 2002) is a French judoka. He became Cadet European Champion and Cadet World champion in 2019 (–90 kg) and Junior World Champion in 2022 (–100 kg).  

On 13 November 2020, he suffered a stroke during a judo competition at the Palais des Expositions in Perpignan. Transferred to Montpellier hospital, he was immediately taken care of by doctors who did not consider it necessary to perform surgery. He has no known sequelae from this health accident.

References

External links
 
 
 

2002 births
Living people
French male judoka
French people of Guadeloupean descent
Guadeloupean male judoka